A Girl in the Street, Two Coaches in the Background (F13, JH179) is an oil painting by Vincent van Gogh.  It is one of his very early works, painted in The Hague in August 1882, at a time when his brother Theo was encouraging him to paint landscapes in colour, rather than drawing figures.  It is an early work to bear his "Vincent" signature, suggesting he was happy with the effect.

Description 
The work in an evening scene of a young blonde woman, with straw hat, dark jacket and skirt, and white apron, carrying a basket as she walks along a dirt road past two horse-drawn carriages which are waiting beside some trees, with some buildings visible beyond. It was probably painted en plein air, quickly, one evening, when Van Gogh stopped on a walk around the city with his easel seeking artistic inspiration.

It measures .

See also
Paintings of Children (Van Gogh series)
List of works by Vincent van Gogh

References

External links

Paintings by Vincent van Gogh
Paintings of the Netherlands by Vincent van Gogh
1882 paintings
Horses in art